Fábio Jardel Veríssimo Lopes (born 7 December 2001) is a Portuguese professional footballer who plays as a forward for Brackley Town.

Career
Lopes began his career with Sporting CP before moving to English non-league club Bicester Town in 2015. After spending time with Brackley Town he joined the Academy of Oxford United in April 2018. He made his debut on 14 August 2018 in the EFL Trophy, becoming the club's third-ever youngest player. He featured in four games in a week in the 2019–20 pre-season.

He joined AFC Rushden & Diamonds on loan in February 2020, before joining Biggleswade Town on a one-month youth loan in September 2020. In January 2021 a proposed loan move to Chippenham Town fell through after he was injured.

After leaving Oxford, he signed for Brackley Town.

Career statistics

References

External links
Fabio Lopes at aylesburyunitedfc.co.uk

2001 births
Living people
Portuguese footballers
Association football forwards
Sporting CP footballers
Bicester Town F.C. players
Brackley Town F.C. players
Oxford United F.C. players
AFC Rushden & Diamonds players
Biggleswade Town F.C. players
Portuguese expatriate footballers
Expatriate footballers in England
Portuguese expatriate sportspeople in England
Footballers from Lisbon